Cillian O'Connor (born 1992) is an Irish Gaelic footballer who plays for Ballintubber and the Mayo county team. O'Connor is the leading all-time top scorer in the All-Ireland Senior Football Championship.

Career 
O'Connor made his Ballintubber club debut whilst still a teenager in 2010. A year later, he made his county debut for Mayo in the Connacht Senior Football Championship against London at Emerald GAA Grounds in South Ruislip after being called up by former Ballintubber manager James Horan, who had given O'Connor his Ballintuber debut as well. O'Connor was named as the captain of Mayo in 2013 after having won two Young Player of the Year awards in the previous two years and led them to the 2013 All-Ireland Senior Football Championship Final. In 2014, he was awarded a GAA GPA All-Star Award after being the top scorer in the 2014 season and leading Mayo to the 2014 All-Ireland Senior Football Championship semi-finals. He won his second GAA GPA All Stars award for the his performance in the 2020 season.

In 2015, O'Connor was in the running for the Golden Boot and initially finished tied for top with Fermanagh's Seán Quigley. However, following a review of Mayo's championship winning DVD, the Gaelic Athletic Association realised they had incorrectly noted O'Connor's score as they had recorded him as having scored 1-6 but he had actually scored 1–7. As a result, O'Connor's tally was increased by 1 which allowed him to claim the Golden Boot.

In 2019, O'Connor became the highest scoring player in the All-Ireland Senior Football Championship, surpassing Kerry's Colm Cooper's record. He had done this by scoring in all of his previous 51 previous Championship matches prior to the record breaking match, except for one game against London in 2013 when he had been black carded. He broke the scoring record for a single championship game with four goals and nine points in the 2020 All-Ireland Senior Football Championship semi-final at Croke Park.

O'Connor sustained an injury to his achilles tendon in the first half of his county's 2021 National Football League promotion play-off win against Clare at Cusack Park and later underwent surgery. It was his 100th appearance for the team. The injury meant he could not play for Mayo again that season. He made his return to Senior Inter County Football off the bench after 56 minutes in the 2022 National League Final.

Scoring record

Honours
Inter-county
Connacht Senior Football Championship (6): 2011, 2012, 2013, 2014, 2015, 2020 ,2021
National Football League (1): 2019
 FBD League: 2023

Club
 Mayo Senior Football Championship (5): 2010, 2011, 2014, 2018, 2019
 Mayo U21 A Football Championship (2): 2009, 2010
Individual
 All Stars Young Footballer of the Year (2) 2011, 2012
 All Star: (2) 2014, 2020
 Mayo Footballer of the Year (1) 2011

References

External links
Interview with The Mayo News

1992 births
Living people
Alumni of St Patrick's College, Dublin
DCU Gaelic footballers
Ballintubber Gaelic footballers
Irish schoolteachers
Mayo inter-county Gaelic footballers
People educated at St Gerald's College, Castlebar
People from Castlebar